The 2002–03 KNVB Cup was the 85th edition of the tournament. The competition started on 6 August 2002 and the final was played on 1 June 2003. FC Utrecht won the cup for the second time by beating Feyenoord 4–1. A total of 86 clubs participated.

Teams
 All 18 participants of the Eredivisie 2002-03: six teams entering in the round of 16 of the knock-out round; one in the first round of the knock-out round and the rest in the group stage
 All 18 participants of the Eerste Divisie 2002-03
 48 teams from lower (amateur) leagues
 Two youth teams

Group stage
The matches of the group stage were played between August 6 and September 4, 2002.

E Eredivisie; 1 Eerste Divisie; A Amateur teams

Knock-out phase

First round
The matches of the first round were played on November 5 and 6, 2002. Eredivisie clubs NAC Breda and Willem II entered the tournament this round. During the group stage, they were still active in the Intertoto Cup.

E two Eredivisie entrants

Second round
The matches of the second round were played on December 3 and 4, 2002.

Round of 16
The matches were played on February 4 and 5, 2003. The six Eredivisie clubs that had been active in European competitions after qualification last season entered the tournament this round.

E six Eredivisie entrants

Quarter-finals
The matches of the quarter finals were played on 4-5 March 2003.

Semi-finals
The matches of the semi-finals were played on 15-16 April 2003.

Final

FC Utrecht would play in the UEFA Cup.

See also
Eredivisie 2002-03
Eerste Divisie 2002-03

External links
 Results by Ronald Zwiers  

2002-03
2002–03 domestic association football cups
2002–03 in Dutch football